St George's Church, Hanworth, is a Church of England parish church based in Hanworth, London. It is dedicated to Saint George and has Grade II* listed status.

History
There has been a church on the site, in Castle Way, since at least the 14th century; the church was first mentioned in 1293. The first known rector was Adam de Brome, founder of Oriel College, Oxford, in 1309.

According to Daniel Lysons, vicar in 1800, the church was made of flint and stone with a low wooden turret. As the church's living was in the hands of the lord of the manor, only the name of the rector was mentioned.

The original church included stained glass windows of the coats of arms of the Crosby family, who owned the manor in 1471; the Killigrew family, who owned the manor in the latter part of the 16th century; and the Royal arms of 1625, incorporating the royal cypher JR. The latter window was moved to the rectory after the church's reconstruction in 1808, before moving to its present site in the Victoria and Albert Museum in 1975. Monarchs and their consorts who are known to have worshipped here are King Henry VIII, Anne Boleyn, Catherine Parr and Queen Elizabeth I.

Baron Cottington of Hanworth took a further interest in Saint George's Church. He had his son Charles baptised here on 21 July 1628 in the presence of King Charles I, the Duke of Buckingham and Mary Feilding, wife of the Marquess of Hamilton. Cottington also gave the church a silver chalice and paten, which are still used today.

In 1807, it was decided that the entire church should be dismantled and rebuilt. The building of the new church was done by James Wyatt, a notable architect of the time. Wyatt only just lived to see it completed in 1812, as he was killed in a carriage accident the following year. His family are buried in the churchyard, but Wyatt himself lies in Westminster Abbey.

Saint George's assumed its current form in 1865, when a local architect, Algernon Perkins, volunteered to redesign the church at his own expense. The spire, added at about this time, was designed by Samuel Sanders Teulon.

The lychgate, which forms the main entrance to the church, was built in 1882. It is said to be a copy of the one in Beddington, South London, and was done in memory of the mother-in-law of John Lyndhurst Winslow, rector at the time.

Two of the owners of Hanworth Manor, Thomas Chamber and Aubrey Vere, are buried in the church. The former has a memorial tablet, which is now in the north transept, while the latter has a gravestone on the church floor.

Present day
Since 25 April 2021, St George's Church, Hanworth has been served by Fr Michael William Dobson as their priest in charge. He was previously rector of St John the Baptist in Cairo Egypt and a mission priest at St Gabriel's, Pimlico. He was ordained in Canada and trained at Regent College Vancouver and with the Artizo programme. He and as his wife Janet have planted Anglo-Catholic communities around Vancouver and in central London. They intend to help St George's to be a flourishing center of Anglo-Catholic mission.

From 1992 until early 2019, Paul Williamson was priest in charge of St George's. The new priest on charge is Father Michael William Dobson.

St George's is a church in the Anglo-Catholic tradition and is also associated with Forward in Faith. As it does not accept the ordination of women, the church receives alternative episcopal oversight from the Bishop of Fulham (currently Jonathan Baker).

Gallery

References

External links

Hanworth
Rebuilt churches in the United Kingdom
19th-century Church of England church buildings
Diocese of London
History of the London Borough of Hounslow
Hanworth
Grade II* listed churches in London
Grade II* listed buildings in the London Borough of Hounslow
Anglo-Catholic churches in England receiving AEO